Theodore Taylor may refer to:
Theodore Taylor (author) (1921–2006), American author
Theodore Taylor (politician) (1850–1952), British businessman and Liberal politician
Ted Taylor (physicist) (1925–2004), American physicist and nuclear weapons designer

See also
Ted Taylor (disambiguation)